The Chinese women's national under 18 ice hockey team is the national under-18 ice hockey team in China. The team represents China at the International Ice Hockey Federation's IIHF World Women's U18 Division I - Qualifications.

World Women's U18 Championship record

^Includes one win in extra time
*Includes one loss in extra time
**Includes two losses in extra time

Ice hockey
Women's national under-18 ice hockey teams